Adonijah is the fourth son of King David in the Bible. The given name may also refer to:

Biblical figures
A Levite sent with the princes to teach the book of the law to the inhabitants of Judah
One of the "chiefs of the people" after the Babylonian captivity

People
 Adonijah Bidwell (1716–1784), colonial American minister and supporter of American independence
 Adonijah Reid (born 1999), Canadian soccer player
 Adonijah Welch (1821–1889), United States Senator from Florida and the first president of Iowa State Agricultural College

See also
 Jacob ben Hayyim ibn Adonijah (c. 1470–before 1538), Jewish biblical scholar

Masculine given names
Hebrew masculine given names
Theophoric names